Arabic is the fastest-growing foreign language taught at U.S. colleges and universities, a trend mirrored at the University of Iowa.

Arabic in 2006 became the 10th most-studied language in the United States.

In 2013, Arabic was ranked the 8th place on the list of enrollments in higher education in the USA.

See also
Arab Americans
History of the Middle Eastern people in Metro Detroit

References

Arab-American culture
Arabic language
Immigrant languages of the United States